Leaving the Fold is a 2008 documentary film on the lives of young men and women who left the Hasidic world of their youth. The young people featured in the film live in Canada, America, and Israel. The film was directed by Canadian filmmaker, Eric R. Scott, and featured in the film is Basya Schechter, a New York-based singer-songwriter. Shechter's music features throughout the film.

Overview 
The film's run time is 52 minutes. Four of the film's interviewees are from the Chabad-Lubavitch Hasidic community. The film was first shown at the Montreal World Film Festival, and subsequently on Canadian, Australian, Belgian, and Finnish television.

See also 
 One of Us (2017 film)
 Let There Be Light (2007 film)
 Chabad in film and television

References

External links 

2008 films
Canadian documentary films
Jewish Canadian films
Chabad in Canada
Documentary films about Jews and Judaism
Films about Orthodox and Hasidic Jews
Films about Chabad
Anti-Orthodox Judaism sentiment
2010s Canadian films
2000s Canadian films